Bruno Mealli (born 20 November 1937) is an Italian former professional road cyclist. He competed in eight editions of the Giro d'Italia.

Major results

1959
1st Giro del Casentino
1960
3rd Gran Premio della Liberazione
1961
1st Giro del Lazio
2nd Giro del Veneto
1962
1st Gran Premio Industria e Commercio di Prato
1st Giro dell'Emilia
1st Stage 8 Volta a Catalunya
1st Stage 12 Giro d'Italia
2nd Trofeo Matteotti
9th Milan–San Remo
1963
1st  Road race, National Road Championships
1st Giro della Romagna
2nd Coppa Sabatini
1964
1st Giro del Lazio
1st Stage 1 Tour de Luxembourg
1st Stage 18 Giro d'Italia
2nd Coppa Agostoni
1965
1st Stage 15 Giro d'Italia
1966
1st Gran Premio Città di Camaiore
1967
1st Giro della Romagna
2nd Milano–Vignola
3rd Giro della Provincia di Reggio Calabria
1968
3rd Coppa Agostoni

References

External links

1937 births
Living people
Italian male cyclists
Cyclists from Tuscany
Sportspeople from the Province of Arezzo